Beauchamps High School, locally known as Beauchamps, is a mixed intake secondary school and sixth form for students aged between 11 and 18 (school years 7 to 13) in Wickford, Essex, England. The sixth form offers post 16 education for students aged 16–18 and accepts both former Beauchamps students and students educated at other establishments.

The current headteacher of the school is Mr Mat Harper. The previous head was Mr Robert Hodges.

History
The school is located in the town of Wickford in Essex, England, and moved to its present site in 1959. The school was called Beauchamps Grant Maintained School until 1999, when its name was changed to Beauchamps High School. In 2003 it acquired a specialist status as a Business and Enterprise school, and in 2008 it obtained a Vocational status. 

In 2014 the school received an Ofsted 'Outstanding' award.

Academics
According to the school's website, in 2007, 60% of A-level passes were at Grades A to C, and 86% of students (a new school record) achieved 5 GCSEs at Grades A* to C. The School was given an outstanding report by Ofsted in December 2006.

In 2010 92% of students achieved 5 GCSEs at grades A*-C and a 98% pass rate (66% A-C) at A-level which are improvements on previous records.

Notable former pupils
 Andy Coulson – former editor of the News of the World
 Rhys Thomas – comedy actor/writer
 Tony Way – comedy actor/writer
 Bobby Lockwood – actor
 Spencer Livermore, Baron Livermore – Labour life peer

References

External links
 Beauchamps High School's website
 Examination result 2010–2012

Secondary schools in Essex
Educational institutions established in 1959
1959 establishments in England
Foundation schools in Essex
Wickford